Following the 2020 United States Election, both US Senate seats in the state of Georgia went to runoffs concurrently held on January 5, 2021. As Democratic challengers defeated both Republican incumbents, Democrats would take control of the senate, giving a trifecta to the newly elected president Joe Biden.

The individual 2021 Georgia runoff elections are:

 2020–21 United States Senate election in Georgia, in which Democrat Jon Ossoff defeated Republican incumbent David Perdue
 2020–21 United States Senate special election in Georgia, in which Democrat Raphael Warnock defeated Republican incumbent Kelly Loeffler
 2020 Georgia Public Service Commission election